Albert Caraco (8 July 1919 – 7 September 1971) was a French-Uruguayan philosopher, writer, essayist and poet of Turkish Jewish descent. He is known for his two major works, Post Mortem (1968) and posthumously published Bréviaire du chaos (1982). He is often compared to the philosophers and writers such as Emil Cioran, Louis-Ferdinand Céline, Nicolás Gómez Dávila and Friedrich Nietzsche.

Biography
Albert Caraco was born Istanbul on 8 July 1919 to a Sephardi Jewish family. His family relocated in Vienna, Prague and later in Berlin, before settling in Paris. He attended to Lycée Janson de Sailly and graduated from Ecole des Hautes Etudes Commerciales in 1939. At the same year, Caraco and his family fled to South America due to Nazi threat and approaching World War II. His family received  Uruguayan citizenship and converted to Catholicism. In early 1940s, Caraco published a series of poems and plays.

In 1946, Caraco returned to Paris, where he spent the rest of his life. Inspired by monastic discipline, he devoted himself to writing, although he renounced his Catholic faith. His mother's death in 1969, which was widely documented in his work, Post mortem, had a negative effect on his state. On 7 September 1971, following his father's death, he committed suicide. Most of his unreleased works were posthumously published by L'Age d'Homme publishing company.

An article regarding Caraco's works and life, written by Louis Nucéra, was published on 4 May 1984 in Le Monde.

Selected works

 Le livre des combats de l'âme (1949)
 L'école des intransigeants. Rébellion pour l'ordre (1952)
 Le désirable et le sublime. Phénoménologie de l'Apocalypse (1953)
 Foi, valeur et besoin, Paris 1957;
 Apologie d'Israël, vol. 1: Plaidoyer pour les indéfendables (1957)
 Apologie d'Israël, vol. 2: La marche à travers les ruines (1957)
 Huit essais sur le mal (1963,1979)
 Le tombeau de l'histoire (1966,1976)
 Les races et les classes (1967)
 Post mortem (1968)
 La luxure et la mort: relations de l'ordre et de la sexualité (1968)
 L'ordre et le sexe (1970)
 Obéissance ou servitude? (1974)
 Ma confession, Lausanne (1975)
 L'homme de lettres: un art d'écrire (1975)
 Bréviaire du chaos (1982)
 Supplément à la "Psychopathia sexualis" (1983)
 Ecrits sur la religion (1984)
 Semainier de l'incertitude (1994)
 La luxure et la mort (2000)
 Mystère d'Israël (2004).

References

External links

 An Essay about Albert Caraco
 
 Studia caracoana by Philippe Billé (in French).
 Romain Delpeuch, Albert Caraco: philosophie, littérature et prophétisme, 2015 (in French)

1919 births
1971 suicides
20th-century French philosophers
Atheist philosophers
Existentialists
French ethicists
20th-century French Sephardi Jews
Turkish expatriates in Austria
Expatriates in Czechoslovakia
Turkish expatriates in Germany
Turkish emigrants to France
French expatriates in Uruguay

French atheists
Former Roman Catholics
Philosophers of art
Political philosophers
Suicides in France
Writers from Paris
Jewish atheists
Jewish poets
Jewish philosophers
20th-century French poets
20th-century French dramatists and playwrights
French male essayists
French male poets
French male dramatists and playwrights
20th-century French essayists
20th-century French male writers
Philosophers of pessimism